Emma Ida Emilia Holmgren (born 13 May 1997) is a Swedish footballer who plays as a goalkeeper for OL.

Career

Holmgren started her career with Swedish sixth tier side Gamlis FF. Before the 2012 season, she signed for Gamla Upsala in the Swedish fourth tier. In 2014, Holmgren signed for Swedish second tier club Sirius.

Before the 2021 season, she signed for Eskilstuna in the Swedish top flight. In 2021, she signed for French top flight team OL, helping them win the league.

References

External links
 

1997 births
Women's association football goalkeepers
Damallsvenskan players
Elitettan players
Eskilstuna United DFF players
Expatriate women's footballers in France
Hammarby Fotboll (women) players
IK Uppsala Fotboll players
Linköpings FC players
Living people
Olympique Lyonnais Féminin players
Swedish expatriate sportspeople in France
Swedish women's footballers